Chevaliera is a subgenus of the genus Aechmea.

Species
Species accepted by Encyclopedia of Bromeliads as of October 2022:

Aechmea aguadocensis 
Aechmea cardenasii 
Aechmea cariocae 
Aechmea castanea 
Aechmea conifera 
Aechmea digitata 
Aechmea fernandae 
Aechmea heterosepala 
Aechmea leucolepis 
Aechmea magdalenae 
Aechmea microcephala 
Aechmea mira 
Aechmea muricata 
Aechmea pallida 
Aechmea paratiensis 
Aechmea perforata 
Aechmea recurvipetala 
Aechmea rubiginosa 
Aechmea serragrandensis 
Aechmea sphaerocephala 
Aechmea strobilacea 
Aechmea tayoensis 
Aechmea timida

References

Plant subgenera